The 45th Karlovy Vary International Film Festival took place from 2 to 10 July 2010. The Crystal Globe was won by The Mosquito Net, a Spanish drama film directed by Agustí Vila. The second prize, the Special Jury Prize was won by Kooky, a Czech action comedy film directed by Jan Svěrák. American film producer Ron Yerxa was the Grand Jury President of the festival.

Juries
The following people formed the juries of the festival:  
Main competition
Ron Yerxa, Grand Jury President (USA)
Mirjana Karanović (Serbia)
Lee Chang-dong (South Korea)
Lola Mayo (Spain)
Alexei Popogrebsky (Russia)
Bohdan Sláma (Czech Republic)
David Stratton (Australia)
Documentaries
 Heino Deckert, Chairman (Germany)
 Ronald Bergan (United Kingdom)
 Rebecca Cammisa (USA)
 Alena Činčerová (Czech Republic)
 Dimitris Kerkinos (Greece)
East of the West
 Marion Döring, Chairwoman of the Jury (Germany
 Mihai Chirilov (Romania)
 Peter Nágel (Slovakia)
 Susanna Nicchiarelli (Italy)
 George Ovashvili (Georgia)

Official selection awards
The following feature films and people received the official selection awards:
 Crystal Globe (Grand Prix) -  The Mosquito Net (La mosquitera) by Agustí Vila (Spain)
 Special Jury Prize -  Kooky by Jan Svěrák (Czech Republic, Denmark)
 Best Director Award - Rajko Grlić for Just Between Us (Neka ostane medju nama) (Croatia, Serbia, Slovenia)
 Best Actress Award - Anaïs Demoustier for Sweet Evil (L'enfance du mal) (France)
 Best Actor Award (ex aequo): Mateusz Kościukiewicz & Filip Garbacz, both for Mother Teresa of Cats (Matka Teresa od kotów) (Poland)
 Special mention of the jury - Another Sky (Drugoje něbo) by Dmitri Mamulia (Russia) & There Are Things You Don’t Know (Chiz-haie hast keh nemidani) by Fardin Saheb-Zamani

Other statutory awards
Other statutory awards that were conferred at the festival:
 Best documentary film (over 30 min) -  Familia by Mikael Wiström & Alberto Herskovits (Sweden)
 Special Mention -  Tinar by Mahdi Moniri (Iran)
 Best documentary film (under 30 min) -  The River (Upe) by Julia Gruodienė & Rimantas Gruodis (Lithuania)
 East of the West Award - Aurora by Cristi Puiu (Romania, France, Switzerland, Germany)
 Special Mention -  The Temptation of St. Tony (Püha Tõnu kiusamine) by Veiko Õunpuu (Estonia, Sweden, Finland)
 Crystal Globe for Outstanding Artistic Contribution to World Cinema - Nikita Mikhalkov (Russia), Juraj Herz (Czech Republic)
 Festival President's Award - Jude Law (United Kingdom)
 Právo Audience Award - Oldboys by Nikolaj Steen (Denmark)

Non-statutory awards
The following non-statutory awards were conferred at the festival:
 FIPRESCI International Critics Award: Hitler in Hollywood (Hitler à Hollywood) by Frédéric Sojcher (Belgium, France, Italy)
 Ecumenical Jury Award: Another Sky (Drugoje něbo) by Dmitri Mamulia (Russia)
 Don Quixote Award: The Mosquito Net (La mosquitera) by Agustí Vila (Spain)
 Europa Cinemas Label: Just Between Us (Neka ostane medju nama) by Rajko Grlić (Croatia, Serbia, Slovenia)
 Czech TV Award - Independent Camera:  Four Lions by Chris Morris (satirist) (UK)
 NETPAC Award (ex aequo): Son of Babylon by Mohamed Al-Daradji (Iraq, UK, France, Netherlands, Palestine, UAE, Egypt) & The Orion (Orion) by Zamani Esmati (Iran)

References

External links
 

2010 film awards
Karlovy Vary International Film Festival